Gardner–Webb University (Gardner–Webb, GWU, or GW) is a private Baptist university in Boiling Springs, North Carolina. It is affiliated with the Baptist State Convention of North Carolina (Southern Baptist Convention). It was founded as Boiling Springs High School in 1905. Gardner-Webb is a classified among "Doctoral/Professional Universities".

Over 3,000 students attend Gardner–Webb, including undergraduate, graduate, and online students. Nine colleges and schools offer more than 80 undergraduate and graduate major fields of study. GWU's Runnin' Bulldogs compete in NCAA Division I as a member of the Big South Conference in most sports, although the men's and women's swim teams compete in the Coastal Collegiate Swim Association and the wrestling team competes in the Southern Conference.

History

Beginnings 
On December 2, 1905, the Boiling Springs High School was chartered as a result of an initiative sponsored by the Kings Mountain Baptist Association (Cleveland County) and the Sandy Run Baptist Association (Rutherford County). The institution served as a place "where the young...could have the best possible educational advantages under distinctive Christian influence." In May 1905, Boiling Springs Baptist Church voted to offer its old church house, five acres of land, and $2,700 to the institution, and on July 10, 1905, Boiling Springs was officially chosen for the site of the school. The location of the High School was essential, as it was located near the border of the school's sponsors, Kings Mountain and Sandy Run, and had easy access to brick building materials. The institution's name, Boiling Springs High School, was decided on October 27, 1905, and its charter was accepted less than two months later by the school's trustees. Willard Winslow Washburn, the man who first set forth the idea of a Christian school at Boiling Springs, and the first man to sign the certificate of incorporation would go on to serve on the board of trustees for the first 30 years of its existence. The town of Boiling Springs is named after the natural springs that can be found on campus. They provided clean water for the school when it began operation in 1907.

J.D. Huggins was made the High School's first principal on July 25, 1907. The complete faculty, which consisted of only five teachers, including Huggins, was hired by the fall of 1907. Classes started in October of the same year, although the main building, the Huggins-Curtis Building, was not complete. Students lived in various homes in the community and used classrooms from the nearby elementary school until the building's completion in 1908. The building included classrooms, auditoriums, a chapel, library, principal's office, cafeteria, living quarters, literary societies, a music room, and parlors. Although it burned down in 1957, it signified the promise and progress of the school so far.

Boiling Springs High School focused on Christian education, as evident in the school's motto, Pro Deo et Humanitate (for God and Humanity). These words were inscribed upon "the ageless granite arch" on campus, which still exists today. Original tuition was $76.05 for a term of nine months, and although the school attracted a wide variety of students with varied interests, its focus centered around ministerial education.

Expansion and growth 
The high school became Boiling Springs Junior College on Sept. 3, 1928 due to the changing educational needs of the area. The Great Depression created many obstacles for the college, but its survival was secured by the sacrifices of loyal supporters. The college began with seven departments: English, mathematics, natural science, foreign language, social science, Bible, and education. The first graduating class consisted of roughly 200 students, with one of the earliest graduates being W. J. Cash, author of The Mind of the South.

In 1942, Governor O. Max Gardner began devoting his energy, time, and wealth to strengthening the college. On June 15, the trustees voted to change the name to Gardner–Webb Junior College in honor of Gardner and his wife, Fay Webb-Gardner. That officially took effect on Aug. 27, 1942. During the following year, the institution embarked on a $300,000 financial campaign. At the conclusion of this initiative the trustees announced the school to be debt-free.

The decades following World War II were years of physical growth and academic development. New buildings went up as enrollments increased. On Oct. 23, 1969, Gardner-Webb filed with the register of deeds for an official name change from Gardner-Webb Junior College to Gardner-Webb College in preparation for the first four-year class (for students earning bachelor's degrees) in 1971. A major step in the institutions' development was its full accreditation as a senior college in December 1971, gaining the name Gardner–Webb College. In 1980, the college began a graduate program, which became the Graduate School in the 1990s. The School of Divinity was also founded during this time. On Nov. 12, 1991 Gardner-Webb was approved to seek university status by the Board of Trustees.  The institution officially became known as Gardner–Webb University in January 1993, culminating years of preparation, and by the early 2000s the school had more than 3,200 students and 135 faculty members.

E. B. Hamrick Hall was listed on the National Register of Historic Places in 1982.

Recent history 
Today, Gardner–Webb offers eight distinct degree programs and a campus of over 225 acres. The campus grew with the addition of the Tucker Student Center in 2012, a building made possible by a $5 million donation by Robert and Carolyn Tucker, owners of Shoe Show, Inc. in Concord, North Carolina. The College of Health Sciences facility (at the former Crawley Hospital complex) opened in 2015 and it houses the Hunt School of Nursing, the Physician Assistant Studies program, the School of Psychological Science & Counselor Education, and the Department of Exercise Science.

GWU received a gift from the Gardner Foundation to support undergraduate research by establishing the Fay Webb Gardner Master Mentorship Program in 2017. In 2019, the university established the first-ever comprehensive and competitive scholarship focusing on students’ character, service, academics and Christian life; the inaugural Tucker Scholar recipient was Leah Carpenter, of Stanley, N.C.

In 2021, Gardner–Webb University purchased nearly two-acres of land and a building on 206 South Main St. in Boiling Springs (property formerly housing a Hardee's restaurant  for over three-decades). In 2022, this site became the focus of a building project for a future amphitheater  complex that will include a fine arts facility with 600-seats, campus shop, eatery, and alumni welcome center. These projects were made possible in part by a lead gift from David and Marie Brinkley. The State of North Carolina also allocated $500,000 towards the outdoor amphitheater project in July 2022.

Campus
The main campus in Boiling Springs is situated on 225 acres in the foothills of the Blue Ridge Mountains between Charlotte and Asheville. There is an additional satellite campus in Charlotte.

Key places
The Tucker Student Center: Completed in Fall 2012, and serves as a central place where students and faculty can meet, study, and dine. Made possible because of a $5 million gift from Carolyn and Robert Tucker, the donation is the largest in university history. The building, which contains the campus shop and post office as well as the university's smaller chapel, is 110,000 square-feet and sits overlooking the Lake Hollifield Complex at the center of campus. Entertainment options include a three-story rock climbing wall, movie theatre and screening room, pool tables, air hockey, table tennis, and lounge areas. The Student Center's restaurants increase the food options on campus with WOW Cafe (World of Wings), SubConnection, Cantina 1905, Simply-To-Go, and the Broad River Coffee Company.
Dover Campus Center: Constructed in 1966 where the Huggins-Curtis building used to be located. It was renovated in 1990 and houses the student cafeteria, lounges, Chick-Fil-A, Undergraduate Admissions offices, and Ritch Banquet Hall. The building is named in memory of Charles I. Dover of Shelby, N.C.
The Quad: Located in the center of campus, and is the location of the majority of dormitories and academic buildings, including Craig Hall (English), Withrow Science Building, O. Max Gardner Hall (Music), and E. B. Hamrick Hall (Business). It is the location of most of the student activities on campus.
John R. Dover Memorial Library: Built in 1974, the current library stands as the third academic library building constructed on Gardner-Webb's campus. Students are able to access over 160 databases on topics pertaining to all majors and programs offered in Gardner-Webb's curriculum. The John R. Dover Memorial Library's mission is to support the academic and creative pursuits of Gardner-Webb students by creating a comfortable and welcoming environment where students can utilize the library's collections and technology, independently or in groups, to meet academic goals. The John R. Dover Memorial Library houses the physical and digital collections of the Gardner–Webb University Archives. The University Archive's digitized holdings include the following collections: Fay Webb Gardner Collection, Kings Mountain Baptist Association Collection, Hymnal Collection, Gardner-Webb Yearbooks & Student Newspaper, Gardner-Webb Literary Societies, and the Thomas Dixon, Jr. Collection. The University Archive's non-digital collections include: the Sandy Run Baptist Association Collection, Ebenezer Baptist Association Collection, Gardner-Webb Historical Buildings & Grounds Collection, the Reverend R. C. Campbell Papers, and the Gardner-Webb Athletics Collection.
Lake Hollifield Complex: Located between Tucker Student Center and University Commons and is named after Mr. and Mrs. Hugh H. Hollifield. The complex features a walking trail, picnic areas, swings, water features, and the Lake Hollifield Bell Tower, which contains a 48 bell carillon.
Suttle Wellness Center: Located in the University Physical development Complex. It is a health and wellness education and resource center available to all students, faculty, staff, and family members of faculty and staff. The center contains a fitness room complete with state-of-the-art fitness equipment. The building also contains Bost Gymnasium, a free weight room, an aerobics studio, and a swimming pool.
The College of Health Sciences: GWU purchased a former community hospital (Crawley Hospital) in 2014 to serve as the home for the Hunt School of Nursing, The Physician Assistant Studies Program and the Department of Exercise Sciences. The 53,500 square-foot building is located on 26 acres, and is equipped with lab space, classrooms, medical simulation rooms, a walking track, physical training and rehabilitation facilities, and office space.
E.B. Hamrick Hall: The Hamrick Hall  is the oldest existing building on the Gardner-Webb campus. It was built during the 1920s and dedicated to students who died during World War I. It was listed on the National Register of Historic Places in 1982, and was rededicated to all students and alumni who died during military service (in all wars since World War I) in 2021. Today, the Hamrick Hall is the home for the Godbold College of Business.

Academics 

There are over 3,000 students enrolled at Gardner–Webb, including the day program, graduate studies, Gardner-Webb Online, and the Degree Completion Program (designed for adult learners seeking to finish their degree). Out of these students, 66% are female and 34% are male, and in all come from a total of 45 foreign countries, 44 states and 91 North Carolina counties. There are  nine colleges and schools that offer nearly 80 undergraduate and graduate major fields of study. The top majors for GWU students are nursing, biology, exercise science, psychology and business. The top five academic departments and programs are Business, Nursing, Natural Sciences, Exercise Sciences and Communication Studies.

Degrees offered include Bachelor of Arts, Bachelor of Science, Associate of Arts, Bachelor of Science in Nursing, Master of Arts in Education, Master of Divinity, Master of Business Administration, Master of Accountancy, International Master of Business Administration, Master of Arts in Counseling, Master of Science in Nursing, Education Specialist, Doctor of Ministry, and Doctor of Education. The university also offers Physician Assistant and Nurse Practitioner programs.

There are more than 154 full-time faculty members, 76% of them with a Ph.D. or equivalent. The average class size is about 17, although classes may contain anywhere between 3 and 30 students.

Degree Completion Program 

This program offers students opportunities for adult learners to continue their studies in order to obtain a baccalaureate degree. To be a part of the program, students must have completed 24 semester hours from a regionally accredited institution. Courses take place online.

Noel program 

The Noel Program for Students with Disabilities is designed to assist disabled students with obtaining their degrees. The program offers services for those who are blind, deaf, or have learning disabilities, and "seeks to provide reasonable accommodations in order for students to receive equal access to a higher education while striving to assist students to obtain the knowledge, skills and confidence to become effective self advocates." Services offered include note-takers, interpreters, lab assistants, mobility training, and adaptive technology.

Rankings  

In the 2021 college rankings of U.S. News & World Report, Gardner–Webb was ranked 277th among national universities. The university also placed in the top tier of graduate schools in the country in the fields of Education and Nursing. In the Top Online Programs Rankings, Gardner–Webb's Business Programs ranked first in Student Services and Technology out of 161 colleges and universities across the nation. Also under the Top Online Programs Rankings, the university placed 15th in Faculty Credentials and Training and 27th in Student Engagement and Accreditation. In 2011, "The Chronicle of Higher Education" placed Gardner–Webb as one of America's best colleges to work for, one of only four colleges in North Carolina and 111 nationwide to earn the recognition. On a global scale, the university's Online MBA Program was ninth for the year of 2012, according to Business MBAs list of the "Top 50 MBA Programs for 2012." For exhibiting what it calls "institutionalized community engagement," the Carnegie Foundation for the Advancement of Teaching awarded Gardner–Webb a Community Engagement Classification. GWU's core curriculum also ranks in the nation's top two percent for quality and breadth, according to the What Will They Learn?  study by the American Council of Trustees and Alumni. The study rated schools on an "A" through "F" scale, where Gardner–Webb has been the only school in the Carolinas, to earn an "A" from 2011 to 2021.

 Admissions 

The acceptance rate at Gardner-Webb is 60%, admissions are conducted on a rolling basis. The average admissions statistics for the class of 2025 are: SAT: 1015; ACT: 22; GPA: 3.72.

The university offers several scholarships. The most prestigious is the Tucker Heart, Soul, Mind, and Strength Scholarship made possible via a $4 million endowed gift from Robert and Carolyn Tucker. This scholarship which will first be awarded in Fall of 2020 will cover the entire cost of a four-year education for one student annually. The university also awards Ignite Excellence Scholarships each year with the top one going to one student and covering Tuition, Room, and Board. There are also four Ignite Scholarships given covering the cost of tuition. Additionally, the university awards multiple levels of merit-based scholarships.

 Honor code 

Gardner–Webb students are expected to follow a strict honor code, signing a pledge upon enrollment to "uphold honesty, integrity, and truthfulness in all realms of University life." These forms are kept in the Office of the Vice President and Dean of Student Development and clearly state that academic lying and cheating will not be tolerated.

Student and faculty responsibilities are clearly outlined in the code, showing that students are fully responsible for their own works and that plagiarism, improper citations, and other forms of unoriginal work are subject to disciplinary actions. Faculty are held responsible for explaining all assignments as thoroughly and clearly as possible, and must be willing to investigate and, if circumstances warrant, press charges against students suspected of academic dishonesty.

If a student is suspected to have committed academic dishonesty, he or she must undergo a process of warnings, reports, conferences, and Judicial Board hearings based on the severity of the action. While the board decides the institutional punishment (academic probation, suspension, etc.), the instructor of the student's course will determine the student's grade in the course.

Any student found responsible for a third offense of academic dishonesty will be expelled from the university with the action noted on the student's transcript.

 Accreditation 
It is affiliated with the Baptist State Convention of North Carolina (Southern Baptist Convention). 

Gardner–Webb is accredited by the Commission on Colleges of the Southern Association of Colleges and Schools to award associate, bachelor's, master's, and doctoral degrees.

In addition, several departmental programs are accredited by the appropriate state or national agencies. The education program is accredited by the North Carolina Department of Public Instruction and the National Council for Accreditation of Teacher Education (NCATE). The music and nursing programs are accredited respectively by the National Association of Schools of Music and the National League for Nursing Accrediting Commission. The School of Divinity is accredited by the Association of Theological Schools of the United States and Canada. The athletic training program is accredited by the Commission on Accreditation of Allied Health Education Programs (CAAHEP). The School of Business is accredited by the Association of Collegiate Business Schools and Programs (ACBSP). The university is authorized by the immigration authorities of the United States for the training of foreign students.

 Student life 

 Demographics 

Gardner-Webb hosts students from 44 different states, 45 foreign countries, and 91 North Carolina counties. The student body is approximately 66% female and 34% male and the racial makeup of the student body is 52% White, 25% Black, 15% Unclassified, 3% Hispanic, 2% Asian, 2% Multiracial, 1% American Indian.

 Residence life 

Gardner–Webb provides its students a variety of residential opportunities on campus, with nine residence halls, three suite style buildings, and seven apartment buildings. All undergraduate students are required to live on campus unless they live with parent or guardian, achieved 90 credit hours of college credit prior to contract/academic year, are at least 21 years of age prior to an academic year, have lived in a residence hall for at least six semesters (fall/spring), are part-time students (taking less than 12 hours), are married, or have served in 120 days of active military service.

The University offers a First-Year Living Community and residence halls separated by gender. Residence Halls include  - Decker, Spangler, Myers, H.A.P.Y., Nanney, Stroup,  Lutz-Yelton, Mauney, and Royster. Currently, the student body is 66% female and 34% male. The residence halls are equipped with Wi-Fi, unlimited washing machine and dryer access, community bathrooms, and residence lobbies equipped for socializing and studying.

University Commons, seven-building apartment designations, are located near the Lake Hollifield Complex. One building contains 12 apartments, each one with a furnished living area, four furnished single bedrooms, unlimited laundry facility access, two bathrooms, and a fully equipped kitchen area with an oven, stove, microwave, refrigerator, sink, and dishwasher. Although the building is co-ed, each apartment is not.

University Commons suites (three buildings), and are similar, except that they house six to eight students per unit instead of four. Each suite contains four bedrooms large enough for two students, two bathrooms, a furnished living room, and a half kitchen with a refrigerator, microwave, and sink. Although the building is co-ed, each suite is separated by gender.

 Clubs and organizations 

Gardner–Webb offers its students opportunities to become involved in a number of activities and organizations around campus. Students work with the Student Government Association leadership to propose new organizations.

A wide variety of organizations are available, including clubs organized around the arts, politics, performance, sports, spirituality, service and culture. There are also a number of academic honor societies including Beta Beta Beta, Sigma Tau Delta, and Alpha Chi and nationally recognized chapters, such as Fellowship of Christian Athletes, College Republicans, and College Democrats.

Gardner–Webb also offers an active Student Government Association (SGA) consisting of an 18-member Senate and five-member executive council. The SGA represents the needs and issues of the students to the university administration and acts as a voice for the students. Members of the SGA also serve on faculty committees and often work hand in hand with university staff. The SGA is also responsible for orchestrating many university events including Homecoming.

 Campus recreation 

Gardner–Webb offers multiple recreational activities designed to "enrich the quality of physical, mental, spiritual, and social life of University community members." Fitness classes, like zumba, aerobics, yoga, and dance, are available, as well as individual training sessions offered through the Suttle Wellness Center. Cross-Fit has also become a sought after activity for students, faculty, staff and the community.  The Broyhill Adventure Course, located next to University Commons and Spangler Stadium, offers students a unique outdoor adventure challenge and opportunities to experience climbing and problem solving. The Tucker Student Center also has a three-story tall climbing wall.

The intramural program offers a variety of individual and team sports during both semesters to accommodate student interests and abilities. Any current student, faculty, or staff member may participate. Sports include beach volleyball, kickball, indoor soccer, disc golf, softball, and basketball, among others. Teams can play under male, female, or coed leagues.

 The Center for Personal and Professional Development 
Gardner–Webb University's Center for Personal and Professional Development (CPPD) works in partnership with faculty and staff to prepare students for life and work beyond college. The CPPD offers close to 50 programs/events each year including, career and internship fairs, networking events, and workshops on jobs/internship search, resume prep, applying to grad school, interview prep, career exploration, and leadership.

 LOTS-MC 
The Life of the Scholar Multidisciplinary Conference (LOTS-MC) is an academic conference founded in 1997 that is held on campus every year for undergraduate and graduate students to present their work. This conference is divided up into academic fields such as Religion & Philosophy, Natural Sciences, and English Language & Literature to name a few. The field of students is often large and the event lasts all day. At the end of the program, an award is given for the best-written paper by a graduate student, and a prize is given for the best presentation by a graduate student. The 20th Anniversary LOTS-MC was held in 2017 and honored the founders of the conference Dr. Les and Joyce Brown.

 Traditions 

 The Arch: A stone arch dedicated in 1943 is located between the Suttle Wellness Center and the Lutz-Yelton Convocation Center. It is a superstition among students that passing through this arch prior to graduation will prevent a student from graduating on time. For this reason, many students will go their entire career avoiding the arch and then with the rest of their fellow students walk through it on graduation day before their commencement.
 Festival of Lights: The festival of lights is a service held every year to mark the beginning of the advent season. The service itself often consists of scripture readings and musical performances by the University Choir and Orchestra as well as congregational singing. At the conclusion of the service, the attendees proceed to the lighting of the university Christmas tree and nativity scene by the university president. There is often a reception that follows in the Tucker Student Center. This event is widely attended by students, faculty, and the public.
 Pancake Bingo: Often considered as a favorite tradition among students, every semester on the Monday night of exam week, the student body gathers in the dining hall to play bingo and eat pancakes. This popular tradition often sees students waiting well in advance for entry.
 Miss Gardner-Webb: The Miss Gardner-Webb Pageant is an annual event sponsored by the Office of Student Activities as a means of fostering personal presentation, maturity, poise, and public speaking in an appropriate competitive setting. The contestants compete in several different categories: Fun Fashion, Talent, Individual Interviews, Evening Gown, and On-Stage Question. Although this event does not serve as a preliminary for any other pageant, it gives the contestants a safe environment to compete in front of their peers and loved ones to become the next Miss Gardner-Webb. As Miss Gardner-Webb, the winner will serve the student body and the surrounding community for a year.
 Founder's Day: Recognizing the signing of the original charter for Boiling Springs High School on Dec. 2, 1905, this day is one of acknowledgement and celebration of the School's past, present and future.
 Last Blast: In Celebration of the final weeks of the academic year, Last Blast offers opportunities for fun, festivities, live music, and focused recreational escape for the students. The week traditionally culminated with the GWU Spring Formal.  Last Blast week was started in 1990 under the direction of the Student Entertainment Association (SEA).   
 Homecoming: Held in the fall of each year, this is an event that serves as a time of reunions, recognitions and celebrations for current students and alumni. Hall of Fame inductions, football game, parade, crowning of the Homecoming Queen, and official reunion opportunities and pre-game tailgate BBQ all serve as opportunities for engagement. 

 Athletics 

Gardner–Webb offers 21 varsity sports at the NCAA Division I level, including football, basketball, baseball, soccer, wrestling, swimming, track and field, cross country, softball, tennis, volleyball, lacrosse, cheerleading, and golf. Ten of these are men's and eleven are women's.

The athletic teams are known as the Runnin' Bulldogs and support the school colors of scarlet, black and white. The bulldogs are part of the Big South Conference, although the men's and women's swim teams belong to the Coastal Collegiate Swim Association, and the wrestling team belongs to the Southern Conference.

 Basketball (Men's): Gardner–Webb men's basketball has also been a growing program. In 2012, the team played against opponents University of North Carolina and earlier, in the 2007–2008 season, pulled an 84–68 upset win against the University of Kentucky. They have reached every national tournament on every level, finally making the NCAA Division I Men's National Tournament in 2019 after winning the Big South conference tournament. That 2018-2019 championship season is the subject of the documentary The Dancin' Bulldogs released on October 16, 2020. The basketball program also has developed recent success as a head coach springboard. Former head coach Chris Holtmann after leaving Gardner-Webb was the head coach of Butler University and now Ohio State.
 Basketball (Women's): In 2011, the women's basketball team were Big South Conference champions and were awarded a No. 14 seed in the NCAA Division I Women's Basketball Championship tournament, facing No. 3 seed Miami. This was the first appearance for the team in the tournament.
 Football: In 2022, Gardner-Webb won the Big South Conference and competed in its first ever NCAA Football Championship Subdivision (FCS) playoffs, winning a first round game on the road against Easter Kentucky University 52-41; during the playoffs, home teams were 20-2, and the Runnin' Bulldogs were one of only two road squads to earn a win. Gardner-Webb dominated the Big South honors for 2022; quarterback Bailey Fisher was Offensive Player of the Year; defensive lineman Ty French was named Defensive Player of the Year; GWU linebacker Ty Anderson was the Defensive Freshman of the Year; Runnin’ Bulldogs linebacker William McRainey was voted the Football Scholar-Athlete of the Year by the league, and GW head coach Tre Lamb was selected Coach of the Year.   Since 1970, teams have won five conference championships (two in the South Atlantic Conference and three in the Big South). The Gardner-Webb Runnin' Football Bulldogs were national runner-ups (NAIA) in 1992 and ended the season with a 12-2 record; they also made the NAIA quarter finals in 1987 with an 11-2 mark. Golf (Men's): Gardner-Webb was a two-time NAIA National Champion (1976, 1977) and runner-up in 1979, all under head coach Garland Allen. Allen also gained national coach of the year honors twice during the championship run. Golfer Zack Byers became the first Gardner-Webb student-athlete to compete in the NCAA Division I Men's Golf Championships. He earned the honor by winning the Big South Tournament and advancing from the NCAA West Palm Beach Regional.
 Swimming (Men's): In 2012, Gardner–Webb University's men's swimming team placed third at the 2008 CCSA conference, setting several school records and finishing closely behind College of Charleston and Davidson. The men's team also made the list of top academic teams for Division I men's swimming, averaging a 3.17 GPA and placing .01 ahead of schools like George Washington University.Swimming (Women's): The women placed third at the 2008 conference championships. Before joining the CCSA conference the women's swim team was a part of the NEC. , the women's team was four time NEC conference champions. In 2012, the women's team won its twelfth consecutive Scholastic All-America (CSCAA) honor, averaging a 3.55 grade average and falling behind schools like Columbia University by .01 and Dartmouth College by .06. The list includes all Division I women's swim teams that average a 3.0 GPA or higher.Soccer (Men's)''': The program began in 1987, and was coached by Tony Setzer from 1988-2022. The Runnin' Bulldogs competed in the 2006 NCAA Tournament moving past No. 23 UAB in the first round before falling to No. 9 Clemson on Nov. 15.

 The Bulldog Mascot 
For over a century, the bulldog mascot has been associated with Gardner-Webb. Athletic marks, living animals, and costumed versions of the mascot have represented Gardner-Webb on the field of play and within the community. The first reported use of the mascot for Gardner-Webb was in 1922.

Throughout the decades, the Gardner-Webb live bulldog mascots have carried names like Butch, Chins, Victor, Barney, Roebuck and Bo. The costumed mascots have been known as Mack, Mac and Lulu, while the trademarked Runnin’ Bulldog logo has been referred to by Mack and Mac.

In 2021, the University Gardner-Webb introduced the newest official live mascot, “Bo”, an English Bulldog. Bo makes appearances at home athletic events, campus and community activities.

 Christian focus 

As a Baptist founded university, Gardner–Webb offers and exhibits many Christian aspects. The Office of Christian Life and Service encourages and challenges the university community in its Christian growth, offering pastoral care to students, faculty, administration and staff. It provides vocational counseling and referral service to students interested in church related vocations as well, and coordinates the planning of worship services held for the university and community, like the Dimensions program. The Office hopes that "through ministry organizations, students are encouraged and challenged in personal discipleship, corporate worship, and life-changing ministry and mission experiences."

 Dimensions 

Dimensions is a graduation requirement for all Gardner–Webb students. The purpose is to nurture attendants spiritually, intellectually and culturally from the perspective of a Christian world view and to promote a sense of community. The program is offered every Tuesday during both the Fall and Spring semesters and counts as 1/2 credit hour. A new speaker addresses the university every week, ranging from staff and faculty to artists, professional athletes, and political speakers, all of whom address subjects that relate to the school's core Christian beliefs. Students must attend 10 sessions each semester for four semesters to obtain all of the Dimensions credits needed to graduate, having a total of 2 credit hours in the course by the end of their academic careers. Credit is given on a pass/fail basis. This means that a total of four semesters, or 40 dimensions, must be attended before graduation.

 Student ministries 

Campus Ministries United is an umbrella association that has worked with Gardner–Webb to create student run ministry groups. Each CMU Council is composed of student leaders who well represent the ideas of Christian Life and Service. Along with the university's ministerial staff, the Council seeks to "promote a passionate and enduring devotion to Christ among students of Gardner–Webb." Student Ministries supports student-led worship services like The Verge, which welcomes all students to worship with others through music, speakers, drama, and fellowship. F.O.C.U.S. Ministries (Fellowship of Christians United in Service), is another program that consists of teams of students who are involved with leading youth retreats locally and regionally.

 Missions 
Throughout Gardner-Webb's history, local, national and international Christian mission opportunities have been provided for students, faculty and staff. From disaster relief efforts, to medical service, to rebuilding broken communities, the Office of Christian Life and Service has become the home for managing and coordinating trips to assist communities in need each year.

 Notable alumni 

 George Adams: Professional basketball player
 Tim Behrendorff: Professional basketball player
 Carl Cartee: Dove Award-winning singer/songwriter
 W.J. Cash: Author of Mind of the South'' (1917–18) when the university was Boiling Springs High School; Cash's sister Bertie attended 1928–30 as a junior college student)
 Dobson Collins: Professional football player
 Linda Combs: Controller of the Office of Management and Budget for two White House Administrations
 John Drew: Professional basketball player
 Orlando Early: College basketball coach
David Efianayi (born 1995), basketball player in the Israeli Basketball Premier League
 Jim Garrison: Professional football coach
 Artis Gilmore: Professional basketball player
 Eddie G. Grigg: President and founder of Charlotte Christian College and Theological Seminary
 Charlie Harbison: College football coach
 Johnny Hunt, former president of the Southern Baptist Convention
 Brian Johnston: Professional football player
 Shannon Kennedy: President of Rappahannock Community College (Virginia)
 Tyler Kettering: Professional soccer player
 Scott Krotee: Professional soccer player
 Blake Lalli: Professional baseball Minor League Manager
 Jon Langston: Country musician
 Martha Mason: Writer
 Jim Maxwell: Professional football player
 Sara McMann: 2004 Olympic Silver Medalist in women's freestyle wrestling; professional mixed martial arts fighter
 Ron Rash: Novelist and poet.
 Chandler Redmond: Only the second documented player in professional baseball to hit for the Home Run Cycle. 
 Chris Salvaggione: Professional soccer player
 Nelson Searcy: Author and evangelist
 Jon-Eric Sullivan: Vice President for Player Personnel, Green Bay Packers
 William Caskey Swaim: Actor
 Jim Washburn: Professional football coach
Mallory Weggemann: Record-setting Paralympic swimmer (and Gold-medalist) for the United States Swim Team. 
 Evans Whitaker: President of Anderson University
 Martin D. Whitaker: Physicist who was the first director of the Clinton Laboratories (now the Oak Ridge National Laboratory) during World War II and then president of Lehigh University
 Eddie Lee Wilkins: Professional basketball player
 Gabe Wilkins: Professional football player
 Patrick Woody: Counterterrorism Analyst and White House Briefer (two administrations)

References

External links
 

 
Baptist Christianity in North Carolina
Education in Cleveland County, North Carolina
Private universities and colleges in North Carolina
Universities and colleges affiliated with the Southern Baptist Convention
Universities and colleges affiliated with the North Carolina Baptist Convention
Educational institutions established in 1905
Universities and colleges accredited by the Southern Association of Colleges and Schools
Buildings and structures in Cleveland County, North Carolina
1905 establishments in North Carolina